Jugla Lake is a large and scenic urban lake in Jugla, Riga, Latvia. The lake has popular beaches in the summer and ice fishing in the winter.

The Ethnographic Open-Air Museum of Latvia is an open-air museum, situated in a forest park area beside Jugla Lake.

See also
Ķīšezers, Riga

References

External links

Geography of Riga
Lakes of Latvia